General-Admiral was the lead ship of her class of armored cruisers built for the Imperial Russian Navy in the early 1870s. She is generally considered the first true armored cruiser.

Design and description
Originally classified as an armored corvette, General-Admiral was redesignated as a semi-armored frigate on 24 March 1875. She was laid out as a central battery ironclad with the armament concentrated amidships. The iron-hulled ship was not fitted with a ram and her crew numbered approximately 482 officers and men.

Propulsion
The ship had a vertical compound steam engine driving a single two-bladed  propeller. She was ship-rigged with three masts. To reduce drag while under sail her funnel was retractable and her propeller could be hoisted into the hull.

See also
 List of Russian inventions

Notes

Footnotes

References

External links

General-Admiral-class cruisers
Naval ships of Russia
1873 ships
Cruisers of the Imperial Russian Navy
Ships built at Sredne-Nevskiy Shipyard